Kenan İmirzalıoğlu (born 18 June 1974) is a Turkish actor and former model. İmirzalıoğlu appeared in the action films Son Osmanlı Yandım Ali (The Last Ottoman: Knockout Ali) and Kabadayı (For Love and Honor). He returned to television in 2009 with the series Ezel and also starred in the action film Ejder Kapanı (Dragon Trap) directed by Uğur Yücel.

Early life
Kenan İmirzalioğlu's lineage came from Uzun Hasan's state who was a sultan of the Aq Qoyunlu dynasty, also known as the White Sheep Turkomans.
He studied at Yıldız Technical University for the Math department. In 1997, he joined the Best Model of Turkey and came first. In the same year, he joined the Best Model of the World and won. Then he drew attention of Osman Sınav who is producer and screenwriter and he took his first role for Osman Sınav's TV series called Deli Yürek as leading actor.

Personal life
İmirzalıoğlu was close with Tuncel Kurtiz and loved him a lot. He was with him on many TV Shows including Ezel. However he died just a couple years later the show was over. Kenan would spend time with him at his farms, houses, etc. On 14 May 2016, İmirzalıoğlu married actress Sinem Kobal. The couple's first child, a daughter named Lalin, was born in October 2020. Their second daughter, named Leyla, was born in May 2022.

Filmography

TV series 
 Deli Yürek (Yusuf Miroğlu) (1998–2002)
 Alacakaranlık (Ferit Çağlayan) (2003–2005)
  Zağara ve Diğerleri (Police) (2005)
 Bitter Life (Mehmet Kosovalı) (2005–2007)
 Ezel (Ezel Bayraktar) (2009–2011)
 Karadayı (Mahir Kara) (2012–2015)
 Mehmed Bir Cihan Fatihi (Sultan Mehmed II) (2018)
 Alef (Kemal) (2020)
Asi hayat (Usman Sinav)

Films
 Deli Yürek: Bumerang Cehennemi (Yusuf Miroğlu) (2001)
 Yazı Tura (Hayalet Cevher) (2004)
 Son Osmanlı Yandım Ali (Yandım Ali) (2006)
 Kabadayı (Devran) (2007)
 Ejder Kapanı (Akrep Celal) (2009)
 Uzun Hikâye (Ali) (2012)
 Cingöz Recai (Recai) (2017)
 Teenage Mutant Ninja Turtles: Mutant Mayhem (Donatello, English version) (2023)

TV programs
 Kim Milyoner Olmak İster? (2019–)

Awards

Cinema

Television

References

External links

 

1974 births
Living people
Turkish male models
Turkish male film actors
Turkish male television actors
Best Actor Golden Boll Award winners
21st-century Turkish male actors
Male actors from Ankara
Golden Butterfly Award winners